Getmore Sithole (born 4 June 1964), is a Zimbabwe–born South African actor. He is best known for his roles in the popular serials A Small Town Called Descent, Le lion and Blood & Water.

Personal life
He was born on 3 June 1964 in Zimbabwe. He is married to Dorriane, a fashion designer since 2002. They together run the business company 'Sandton Elite Apartments'.

Career
He made acting debut in 2000 with a recurring role on the television serial Generations. Then in 2002, he acted in another soapie Backstage as tough detective 'Dikobo'. In 2004, he made a supporting role of 'Detective Ditini' in the police procedural television series Jozi Streets. During this period, he played the role 'Advocate Maponya' on the popular soap opera Rhythm City. In 2003, he made film debut with French feature Le Lion.

In 2005, he joined the cast of e.tv soapie, Scandal!. In the serial, he played the role 'Cain Gumede', and the show became highly popular. He continued to make acting appearance another soap opera The Wild and played the role incorruptible 'Joseph Sithole'. In 2014, he was nominated in Moneygram’s Zimbabwe Achievers Awards in the category of Personality Of The Year Award. In 2015, he recurred as 'Bab' Shezi' for two seasons on the soapie Ashes to Ashes in which he played until end of 2016. After the serial Ashes to Ashes, he made supportive roles for several South African television serials such as, Intersexions, Wild at Heart, 4Play: Sex Tips for Girls, Jozi-H, Diamond City, Sokhulu & Partners, 90 Plein Street and The Docket.

In late 2019, he joined the cast of Netflix original coming-of-age drama series Blood & Water, which made his first international appearance. The series debuted in 190 countries on 20 May 2020 and later received critical acclaim.

Apart from acting, he also worked as a voice artist notably on MTN's official voice for the 2010 FIFA World Cup Finals in South Africa and the MTN official voice in Africa and parts of the Middle East from 2009-2015. Other than television, he acted in feature films including: Mrs Mandela, Free Willy: Escape from Pirate's Cove, Clarissa's Secret, An Act of Defiance, The Last Victims, Blood & Oil and A Covert Affair.

Filmography

References

External links
 

Living people
South African male television actors
1964 births
South African male film actors
Zimbabwean actors